A referendum on whether clergy should be eligible to sit in the Council of Government was held in Malta in 1870. It was approved by 96% of voters. Only 60% of those eligible to vote participated.

Results

References

Referendums in Malta
Malta
1870 in Malta